Tersane Island (literally Shipyard island) is a Mediterranean Island of Turkey.

Location
Administratively, the island is a part of Fethiye ilçe (district) of Muğla Province. It is separated from Domuz Island by a narrow channel to the west. There are three small bays and the bay at the north west corner is well protected. The northeast part of the bay has a very shallow harbour.

History
The ancient name of the island was Telandria and Telandros. There are ruins from the Lycian era.
During the Ottoman Empire age the island was probably  a ship building and repair harbor. the population of the island left the island following the Population exchange agreement between Greece and Turkey. Although the island is currently  uninhabited there is a restaurant with a quay for the yachters.

References

External links
For images

Islands of Turkey
Islands of Muğla Province
Fethiye District
Mediterranean islands
Former Greek towns in Turkey